Rage of Honor is a 1987 American martial arts film directed by Gordon Hessler and starring Sho Kosugi.

Cast
Sho Kosugi – Shiro Tanaka
Lewis Van Bergen – Havlock
Robin Evans – Jennifer Lane
Richard Wiley – Ray Jones
Ulises Dumont – Harry
Gerry Gibson – Dick Coleman
Martín Coria – Jorge
Ned Kovas – Havlock's guard
Lilian Rinar – Havlock's girlfriend
Hugo Halbrich – Pilot / Killer
Masafumi Sakanashi – Prison ninja
Kiyatsu Shimoyama – Prison ninja
Alejo Apsega – Killer in hotel
Ezequiel Ezquenazi – Killer in hotel

References

External links

1987 films
1980s English-language films
1980s Spanish-language films
American martial arts films
American action films
Ninja films
Films directed by Gordon Hessler
Films scored by Stelvio Cipriani
1987 martial arts films
Japan in non-Japanese culture
1987 multilingual films
American multilingual films
Argentine multilingual films
1980s American films